DXIL (103.1 FM), on-air as 103.1 Wild FM, is a radio station owned by UM Broadcasting Network. The station's studio is located at Bro. Geoffrey Rd., Brgy. Palao, Iligan.

References

Radio stations in Iligan
Radio stations established in 1992